Acetylcorynoline is a bio-active isolate of Corydalis ambigua. It inhibits the maturing of bone marrow-derived dendritic cells in mice. However, it is only cytotoxic in amounts of greater than 20 μM.

References

External links
 Protective action of corynoline, acetylcorynoline and protopine against experimental liver injury in mice

Isoquinoline alkaloids
Quinoline alkaloids